"Lactobacillus thermophilus" is a gram-positive, non-motile, non-sporulating rod-shaped bacterium. It belongs to the genus Bacillus, but has not been formally named or reclassified. Found mostly in pasteurized milk, the bacterium is reported to grow optimally from 50 °C to 60 °C. The bacterium is a facultative anaerobe and has shown the ability to create acid using numerous sugars and alcohols. Most of the lactic acid produced by the organism is D-lactic acid, however studies have shown the production of some L-lactic acid.

References 

Lactobacillaceae